Bozova is a district of Şanlıurfa Province of Turkey, 38 km from the city of Şanlıurfa.

References

Populated places in Şanlıurfa Province
Districts of Şanlıurfa Province
Kurdish settlements in Turkey